The 2019–20 season was Falkirk's first season in League One following their relegation from the Championship at the end of the 2018–19 season. Falkirk also competed in the League Cup, Challenge Cup and the Scottish Cup. On 13 March 2020 all SPFL competitions were indefinitely suspended due to the coronavirus pandemic.

Summary
Falkirk began the season on 3 August 2019 and was scheduled to end on 2 May 2020. On 8 April 2020, the SPFL proposed to end the 2019–20 season by utilising a points per game ratio to determine the final standings. The plan was approved on 15 April 2020, declaring that the season was over, with Raith Rovers being named as title winners and relegating Stranraer to League Two.

Management
Falkirk began the 2019–20 season under the management of Ray McKinnon who had been appointed midway through the previous season. On 16 November, McKinnon left his position as manager with the club in fourth place. Former Falkirk player David McCracken and striker Lee Miller were appointed as replacement co-managers on 19 November on an interim basis before being installed permanently on 13 December.

Results and fixtures

Pre Season

Scottish League One

Scottish League Cup

Group stage
Results

Scottish Challenge Cup

Scottish Cup

Player statistics

|-
|colspan="12"|Players who left the club during the 2019–20 season
|-

|}

Team Statistics

League table

Division summary

Transfers

Players in

Players out

See also
List of Falkirk F.C. seasons

References

Falkirk
Falkirk F.C. seasons